A shadow toll is a contractual payment made by a government per driver using a road to a private company that operates a road built or maintained using private finance initiative funding. Payments are based, at least in part, on the number of vehicles using a section of road, often over a 20- to 30-year period. The shadow tolls or per vehicle fees are paid directly to the company without intervention or direct payment from the users.

On more recent shadow toll schemes in the United Kingdom, payments reduce as the number of vehicles increase, to encourage availability of the road rather than the number of vehicles carried.

History
First proposed by the UK Government in 1993, shadow tolls have been widely used in the UK and also to a more limited extent in other countries, including Belgium, Canada, Finland, Netherlands, Spain and the United States. Portugal introduced schemes in 1999 but replaced these with the public tolls in 2004.

The use of shadow tolls in the UK has reduced over time with PFI funded project payments being made based primarily on the availability of the road, and not on the number of vehicles using it. Beyond a certain number of vehicles, the 'toll' paid by the government in more recent schemes is zero.

Criticism

The World Bank observes that transaction costs 'can be very high' due to the difficulties surrounding legal arrangements and the need for continuous vehicle counts and that use of shadow tolls has led to significant criticism in The Netherlands.

The Portuguese government removed shadow tolls in 2004 after finding that "payment obligations in connection with the shadow toll system were not compatible with the need to spend on improving and maintaining the other national motorways".

List of shadow toll roads

Europe
United Kingdom
M1 Lofthouse to Bramham link road
M40 Denham to Warwick
M80 Stepps to Haggs
A1 Darrington to Dishforth
A1(M) Alconbury to Peterborough
A13 Limehouse to Wennington (Greater London)
A19 Dishforth to Tyne Tunnel
A249 Stockbury (M2) to Sheerness
A30 Exeter to Bere Regis
A417 Gloucester to Cirencester
A419 Swindon to Cirencester
A50 Stoke to Derby link
A55 Llanfairpwll to Holyhead
A69 Carlisle to Newcastle

Belgium
A605 / E25 Cointe Tunnel

Finland
VT4 / E75 Järvenpää-Lahti

Netherlands
A9 Wijkertunnel

Spain
 Madrid M-45 Road
 Rande Bridge

Oceania 

Australia

 Peninsula Link: Victoria, Australia

Middle East
Israel
 Highway 431

North America
Canada
New Brunswick Highway 2 Fredericton to Moncton

See also
Toll road
Highways Agency

References

External links
About DBFO UK Highways Agency
DBFO UK Highways Agency
Summary of UK Parliamentary questions relating to DBFO roads UK Highways Agency
Design Build Finance Operate Federal Highways Administration
All that money growing on trees FT.com blog March 2012
Criticism of A1 Darlington to Dishforth scheme

Toll (fee)
Roads in the United Kingdom
Public–private partnership

External websites in relation to North American shadow tolls 

A GUIDEBOOK TO THE BIPARTISAN INFRASTRUCTURE FOR STATE, LOCAL, TERRITORIAL, AND TRIBAL GOVERNMENTS AND OTHER DEPARTMENTS